Jim Hoskinson is a television director. He currently directs The Late Show with Stephen Colbert on CBS. He formerly directed The Colbert Report, which aired on Comedy Central and Last Week Tonight with John Oliver on HBO. Host Stephen Colbert often calls for him on-screen as "Jim" or "Jimmy" for minor assistance during The Late Show, which he had also done on The Colbert Report.

Background

Hoskinson is from Connecticut. He began his television career as a cable puller for a Disney show. He later went to work for CBS's Inside Edition when Bill O'Reilly was anchor. He then had a six-year directing stint at Fox News. Because of this experience, he was hired for the job on The Colbert Report, which was heavily modeled on pundits like O'Reilly and networks like Fox. In 2015 he became a director of The Late Show with Stephen Colbert on CBS, following Colbert, who had left Comedy Central in 2014.

Accolades
Hoskinson has been nominated for seven Emmy Awards and one Directors Guild of America award.

He was cited for outstanding directing in 2009.

References

External links
 

Living people
American television directors
People from Connecticut
The Colbert Report
Year of birth missing (living people)